María Eugenia Rodríguez Palop (born 1970) is a Spanish jurist, professor of Philosophy of Law at the Charles III University of Madrid (UC3M), specializing in human rights.

Biography 
Born on 9 March 1970 in Llerena, a town in the province of Badajoz, she obtained a degree in Law at the Comillas Pontifical University in 1993, later obtaining a PhD in the same field at the UC3M in 2000.

A professor of Philosophy of Law at the Charles III University of Madrid (UC3M), specialized in human rights, she has also worked a researcher at the Institute of Genre Studies and the Institute of Human Rights "Bartolomé de les Casas" in the UC3M. Self-described as "feminist" and "ecologist", she was one of the 60 scholars signataries of a manifesto claiming for a reform of the Spanish Constitution aiming to promote a "federal political project" in June 2018.

In March, following the announcement of the resignation of Pablo Bustinduy to run as leader of the Unidas Podemos candidacy to the 2019 European Parliament election in Spain, Podemos and Bustinduy presented Rodríguez Palop as his replacement. Rodríguez Palop, described then by Bustinduy as a "political and moral mainstay", had previously provided advisory services to the Podemos parliamentary group in the Congress of Deputies.

Works

References

Bibliography 
 
 
 

Academic staff of the Charles III University of Madrid
Spanish jurists
1970 births
Living people
MEPs for Spain 2019–2024